The 2021 Engie Open de Biarritz was a professional women's tennis tournament played on outdoor clay courts. It was the eighteenth edition of the tournament which was part of the 2021 ITF Women's World Tennis Tour. It took place in Biarritz, France between 12 and 18 July 2021.

Singles main-draw entrants

Seeds

 1 Rankings are as of 28 June 2021.

Other entrants
The following players received wildcards into the singles main draw:
  Loïs Boisson
  Séléna Janicijevic
  Margaux Rouvroy
  Léa Tholey

The following player received entry using a protected ranking:
  Louisa Chirico

The following player received entry using a junior exempt:
  Emma Navarro

The following players received entry from the qualifying draw:
  Amanda Carreras
  Estelle Cascino
  Anna Gabric
  Joanna Garland
  Léolia Jeanjean
  Tatiana Pieri
  Alice Robbe
  Oksana Selekhmeteva

Champions

Singles

 Francesca Jones def.  Oksana Selekhmeteva, 6–4, 7–6(7–4)

Doubles

  Oksana Selekhmeteva /  Daniela Vismane def.  Sarah Beth Grey /  Magali Kempen, 6–3, 7–6(7–5)

References

External links
 2021 Engie Open de Biarritz at ITFtennis.com
 Official website

2021 ITF Women's World Tennis Tour
2021 in French tennis
July 2021 sports events in France
Open de Biarritz